The Platinum Triangle is an informal name for three adjacent neighborhoods in the Los Angeles Westside area. It includes Beverly Hills, which is its own city within Los Angeles County, along with two Los Angeles city neighborhoods, Bel Air and Holmby Hills. The "Platinum Triangle" designation refers to the affluence of the neighborhood and its large, multi-million-dollar homes. Beverly Hills in particular contains the largest homes in the Los Angeles area. The area is consistently ranked as one of the most expensive housing markets in the country. 

Homes in the neighborhood have held the record for most expensive real estate in the United States. A $94 million home sale in 2001 held the record for 15 years, up to the sale of the Playboy mansion in 2016. 

In the 1980s, the area was known as the Golden Triangle.

In popular culture
A 2011 book called Unreal Estate: Money, Ambition and the Lust for Land in Los Angeles, by Michael Gross, describes the social history of the Platinum Triangle as reflected in its great houses.

References

Neighborhoods in Los Angeles
Bel Air, Los Angeles
Beverly Hills, California
Holmby Hills, Los Angeles
Westside (Los Angeles County)